Alle lieben Jimmy (Everybody Loves Jimmy) was a German comedy television series which was produced by Bavaria Film GmbH for RTL between 2005 and 2007.

See also
List of German television series

External links
 

German comedy television series
2005 German television series debuts
2007 German television series endings
RTL (German TV channel) original programming
German-language television shows